The 1855 Wairarapa earthquake occurred on 23 January at about 9.17 p.m., affecting much of the Cook Strait area of New Zealand, including Marlborough in the South Island and Wellington and the Wairarapa in the North Island. In Wellington, close to the epicentre, shaking lasted for at least 50 seconds. The moment magnitude of the earthquake has been estimated as 8.2, the most powerful recorded in New Zealand since systematic European colonisation began in 1840. This earthquake was associated with the largest observed movement on a strike-slip fault, maximum . It has been suggested that the surface rupture formed by this event helped influence Charles Lyell to link earthquakes with rapid movement on faults.

Tectonic setting
New Zealand lies along the boundary between the Australian and Pacific Plates. In the South Island most of the relative displacement between these plates is taken up along a single dextral (right lateral) strike-slip fault with a major reverse component, the Alpine Fault. In the North Island the displacement is mainly taken up along the Kermadec subduction zone, although the remaining dextral strike-slip component of the relative plate motion is accommodated by the North Island Fault System (NIFS). A group of dextral strike-slip structures, known as the Marlborough Fault System, transfer displacement between the mainly transform and convergent type plate boundaries in a complex zone at the northern end of the South Island. The earthquake occurred on the Wairarapa Fault which is part of the NIFS.

Earthquake characteristics

The estimated magnitude of about 8.2 is unusually large for an earthquake associated with movement on a mainly strike-slip fault, and the coseismic offset would have been the largest known for such an event. It has been suggested that this was caused by the rupture propagating down to where the fault links through to the top of the subducting Pacific Plate. Geomorphological evidence, particularly the uplifted beach ridges observed at Turakirae Head, appears to record three previous coseismic uplifts of the Rimutaka Range caused by earthquakes similar in magnitude to the 1855 event, with a recurrence interval of about 2200 years.

Damage

Wellington experienced severe shaking but the resulting damage was reduced as the city had been extensively rebuilt following the 1848 Marlborough earthquake using mainly wooden structures; only one recorded fatality (by collapse of a brick chimney) occurred, though several other buildings were damaged. Reports identify at least another four people (possibly as many as eight) as having died in the Wairarapa during the earthquake and a bridge over the Hutt River was wrecked. Numerous landslides were associated with the earthquake, including the harbour-side cliffs near Newlands and numerous events along the slopes of the Rimutaka Range. Minor damage was recorded in places as far away as New Plymouth, Lyttelton and Christchurch. 

The uplift of the northwestern side of Wellington Harbour rendered many of the jetties in the harbour unusable, although this new area of land provided a new rail and road route to the north. Much of modern Wellington's central business district is formed by reclamations on land raised from the harbour by the event, as shown by the series of "Shoreline 1840" plaques.

Along with other historic earthquakes in the Wellington region, the severe uplift and landslides along the coastline caused by the 1855 Wairarapa earthquake would have likely extirpated local populations of Durvillaea antarctica southern bull kelp. For comparison, a large-scale die off of Durvillaea was observed following the 2016 Kaikōura earthquake. The removal of D. antarctica along the Wellington coastline in 1855 (or earlier) would have created an ecological opportunity, which may have facilitated a northward range expansion for Durvillaea poha from the South Island.

Tsunami
New Zealand's National Institute of Water and Atmospheric Research created an animated tsunami simulation model based on the 1855 Wairarapa event, which was screened on the television tele-drama "Aftershock".

See also
1843 Wanganui earthquake
1888 North Canterbury earthquake
List of earthquakes in New Zealand
List of historical earthquakes
List of historical tsunamis

References

Further reading
 

Earthquakes in New Zealand
Wairarapa earthquake
Wairarapa earthquake
Wairarapa
History of the Wellington Region
Tsunamis in New Zealand
1855 tsunamis
January 1855 events
1850s in Wellington
1855 disasters in New Zealand